Ucea is a commune in Brașov County, Transylvania, Romania. It is composed of four villages: Corbi (Korb), Feldioara (Barcaföldvár), Ucea de Jos (the commune center) and Ucea de Sus (Felsőucsa).

The commune is located at the western edge of the county, on the border with Sibiu County, in the historic Țara Făgărașului region. It sits on the left bank of the Olt River, and is traversed south to north by the Ucea River, which flows into the Olt a short distance away.

See also
 Castra of Feldioara
 Ucea de Sus Solar Park

References

Communes in Brașov County
Localities in Transylvania